Kedgley Intermediate School is an intermediate school (years 7–8) in Papatoetoe, a suburb of Auckland, New Zealand

The school opened in February 1958 as Papatoetoe Intermediate School. Classes were held in part of Papatoetoe High School for the first year. After principal Maurice F. Kedgley died the school was renamed Kedgley Intermediate School in his memory in 1968, and Otara Intermediate School was renamed Papatoetoe Intermediate School.

Teachers at Kedgley Intermediate have subject specialisations, such as science, social studies and physical education.

References

Educational institutions established in 1958
Intermediate schools in Auckland
1958 establishments in New Zealand
Ōtara-Papatoetoe Local Board Area